is a town located in Iburi Subprefecture, Hokkaido, Japan.

On March 27, 2006,  absorbed the town of Hobetsu to create the new town of Mukawa. The new town was given the same name as the former town of Mukawa, but in hiragana, instead of former kanji name.

As of April 30, 2017, the town (including the Hobetsu area) has an estimated population of 8,527, with a total of 4,369 households. The total area is 166.43 km².

Mukawa is situated on the southern coast of Hokkaido, bordering the Pacific Ocean. It can be accessed via train from Tomakomai. By car, the town is approximately 1/2 hour east of Tomakomai along Route 235.

The town is famed for shishamo, a small fish that is hung on bamboo poles. Shishamo are currently included in the Mukawa town sign. The shishamo are harvested during the Fall season. During this season the town holds a number of shishamo themed events, including a town race in October and Shishamo Matsuri in November.

A large community center in the town features an indoor swimming pool, exercise room, hotel, onsen, cafe, restaurant, and lecture hall. During the late Summer, an obon matsuri is held near the town's community center.

Population Statistics

In recent years, Mukawa has faced an overall decline in population. In 1995, there were 7,853 people and 2,786 households. In 2000, the population declined to 7,232 people with 2,744 households, and by 2005, the population had declined to 6,765 people and 2,698 households.  These numbers do not include the population of Mukawa's Hobetsu area.

Climate

Transportation

Rail
Mukawa is served by the JR Hokkaido Hidaka Main Line. Plans to restore this section of the line have been abandoned, due to declining passenger numbers and very high maintenance costs, and the section will be officially closed on 1 April 2021 to be replaced by a bus service.

Stations in Mukawa:  -  - 

There has been no train service at Shiomi since January 2015, as it falls into the affected section of the line.

Workforce

As of the 2006, as total of 3,884 people are employed in Mukawa (excluding the workforce of Hobetsu). The working population is broken into different categories depending on occupational type and the number of workers, as shown below:

Land Usage

The 2006 Handbook does not distinguish between Hobetsu or Mukawa regarding land usage. The areas of Hobetsu (546.48 km²), and Mukawa (166.43 km²) total to 712.91 km². Of this total area, the land usage is divided into the following categories:

Annual expenditure

As with the proceeding information, the following comes from the Mukawa 2006 Handbook. The following information regarding the 2005 town expenditures does not consider Mukawa and Hobetsu separately. The unit of currency is millions of yen.

Annual Income 

The following information for the 2005 income is also from the Mukawa 2006 Handbook, and as with the annual expenditure, Mukawa and Hobetsu are considered as a unified area. The unit of currency is millions of yen.

Notes

External links

Official Website 

Towns in Hokkaido